Karim Zand (1924–2017) was a Kurdish historian and geographer known for his writings on Kurdish history, tribes and language. From the 1940s to his death, he wrote more than twenty books and five hundred articles.

Biography 
Zand was born in 1924 in Sulaymaniyah and completed primary, secondary and religious school in the neighborhood he was born in. He afterwards moved to Baghdad and graduated from the Teachers' College in 1944 and became a teacher. He started writing in 1940 and had since 1938 been involved in politics including in Republic of Mahabad. He moreover travelled to the Soviet Union with Kurdish leader Mustafa Barzani.

Beside Kurdish, he spoke Arabic, English, French and Persian.

In 1977, he published the book Kurdish language and translation technic.

References 

1924 births
2017 deaths
People from Sulaymaniyah
20th-century Kurdish people
Kurdish historians